Ketengus typus, the bigmouth sea-catfish, is the only species in the sea catfish genus Ketengus (order Siluriformes).

This fish is found in South and Southeast Asia in India, Andaman Islands, Malaysia, Thailand, and Indonesia. It is distributed in the Eastern Bay of Bengal and Malay Peninsula in nearshore coastal waters, estuaries, and lower reaches of rivers. It lives mostly in brackish waters and rarely freshwaters.

Katengus typus feeds on scale of other fishes, invertebrates and small fishes. K. typus grows up to 25.0 centimetres TL.

References

Ariidae
Catfish of Asia
Catfish of Oceania
Fish of the Indian Ocean
Fish of the Pacific Ocean
Fish of South Asia
Fish of India
Fauna of the Andaman and Nicobar Islands
Fish of Thailand
Fish of Indonesia
Fish of Malaysia
Marine fish of Southeast Asia
Taxa named by Pieter Bleeker
Catfish genera
Monotypic ray-finned fish genera